Patrick Giles (1899 – 13 March 1965) was an Irish Fine Gael politician. He was born in 1899 on a family farm outside Longwood village in County Meath. 

During the Irish War of Independence he was a member of the Irish Republican Brotherhood (IRB), and was captain of the local Longwood Company. In 1920 he and some of his brothers took part in a raid on the Royal Irish Constabulary (RIC) Barracks in Trim, which was burnt to the ground. The aim of the raid was to supply arms to local volunteers. After the raid the arms were dispersed to different sites, one of which was the Giles family farm. During a raid by the Crown forces, his name was found on a note linking him to the storing of these arms and he was sent to prison in Perth, Scotland for three years, but he got out after one year shortly before the Anglo-Irish Truce. In the split that followed after the Anglo-Irish Treaty, he, like most of the IRA in County Meath took the Pro-treaty side. Later he served in the National Army and achieved the rank of captain.

In 1934 he was elected to Meath County Council. In 1935, Giles was elected to the Executive Committee of the League of Youth, one of the many names of Eoin O'Duffy's fascistic Blueshirts.

At the 1937 general election he was elected as a Teachta Dála (TD) for Fine Gael representing the Meath–Westmeath. By this time he had acquired a farm in Drumlargan near Summerhill, County Meath. He held his seat in subsequent elections until the constituency was abolished prior to the 1948 general election. At the 1948 general election he was elected for the re-established Meath constituency. He held his seat up to the 1961 general election in which he was unable to run due to deteriorating health. He died on 13 March 1965.

Anti-semitic quotes
"Who owns the wealth of Dublin? Is it the Irish volunteers or the Irish people? No, it is not, but the rotten old Jews." - Dáil Éireann, 1 December 1937.

" I think it is a terrible thing that we, who call ourselves a Christian people, should stand idly by and allow the Jews, the Gentiles, the Freemasons and Communists to dictate the policy of the world. We stand for Christianity. We stand for it against the Jews, the Gentiles, the Reds and the Freemasons of the world."  - Dáil Éireann, 13 July 1938.

"To-day Minister for Defence Frank Aiken ] is nothing more than Britain's tool for the coming European war, engineered by the financiers and Jews of the world." -  Dáil Éireann, 16 February 1939.

"..the finance of the country is in the hands of Jews and foreigners" -  Dáil Éireann, 10 May 1940.

References

Sources
Politics and War in Meath 1913–1923, Oliver Coogan.

1899 births
1965 deaths
Antisemitism in Ireland
Fine Gael TDs
Irish anti-communists
Members of the 9th Dáil
Members of the 10th Dáil
Members of the 11th Dáil
Members of the 12th Dáil
Members of the 13th Dáil
Members of the 14th Dáil
Members of the 15th Dáil
Members of the 16th Dáil
Members of the Blueshirts
Members of the Irish Republican Brotherhood
Politicians from County Meath
National Army (Ireland) officers